Centaurea acaulis, the stemless star thistle, is a species of plant in the family Asteraceae.

Sources

References 

acaulis
Flora of Malta